The Tchefuncte River drains into Lake Pontchartrain in Louisiana in the United States.

Etymology
The name Tchefuncte is believed to derive from the word Hachofakti which is the Choctaw word for the American chinquapin which is a species of chestnut and was used by Native Americans to relieve headaches and fevers.

Tchefuncte culture 
The area around the river was inhabited by the hunter-gatherer Tchefuncte culture dating back to 600 BCE. The Native Americans gathered fresh-water clams, fish and crawfish and built shell middens on the river. Their houses were probably temporary circular shelters having a frame of light poles covered with palmetto, thatch, or grass mixed with mud.

Tchefuncte shipyard 
During the War of 1812 the Secretary of the Navy William Jones ordered Captain John Shaw to supervise the construction of a shallow-draft Blockship armed with 32 heavy cannons at the shipyard in Madisonville, Louisiana. On December 16, 1814 Major General Andrew Jackson wrote a letter to the Secretary of War John Armstrong Jr. demanding that the ship be completed. When the Battle of New Orleans began the vessel was still moored at the Madisonville Naval shipyard unfinished.

Lighthouse 
In 1837, the Tchefuncte River Range Lights was built to guide vessels across Lake Pontchartrain to the mouth of the Tchefuncte River. The lighting apparatus was supplied by Winslow Lewis and consisted of nine lamps with several fourteen-inch reflectors. The lighthouse was damaged sometime during the Civil War and was repaired in 1867. The U.S. Coast Guard later took control over the lighthouse in 1939 and used an electrical automation system to power the lighthouse. Then in 1999 the local town of Madisonville, Louisiana assumed ownership and the Institute of Museum and Library Services issued a grant for restoring the historical property. The lighthouse survived the Hurricane Katrina and Rita and continues to be an important historical location.

Course 

The Tchefuncte rises in northeastern Tangipahoa Parish and initially flows southward; the river is used to define part of the eastern boundary of Tangipahoa Parish and parts of the western boundaries of Washington and St. Tammany Parishes before turning southeastward into St. Tammany Parish, where it passes the city of Covington and the town of Madisonville.

Today
In the 19th century, the Tchefuncte River was an important commercial waterway, where building materials and other products of the North Shore of Lake Pontchartrain were loaded to be shipped across the Lake to New Orleans. Today, the area around the river mouth in Madisonville has a riverside park, yacht marinas, restaurants, coffee shops, and bars, and the Lake Pontchartrain Basin Maritime Museum. 

 
The Tchefuncte has been designated by the government of Louisiana as a "Natural and Scenic River."  Fairview-Riverside State Park is located along the river, upstream of Madisonville.

See also
 List of Louisiana rivers

References

External links
 Fairview-Riverside State Park

Rivers of the New Orleans metropolitan area
Rivers of Louisiana
Tributaries of Lake Pontchartrain
Bodies of water of Washington Parish, Louisiana
Rivers of Tangipahoa Parish, Louisiana
Rivers of St. Tammany Parish, Louisiana